Kamiokite is an iron-molybdenum oxide mineral with the chemical formula Fe2Mo3O8. The name kamiokite is derived from the locality, the Kamioka mine in Gifu Prefecture, Japan, where this mineral was first discovered in 1975.

Kamiokite is a hexagonal system with equal axes a1, a2, a3. These three axes of the kamiokite crystal are uniformly separated by 120°. Kamiokite is an anisotropic mineral, meaning that light travels through the mineral in different directions and velocities. Kamiokite is strongly pleochroic and is also birefringent.

Kamiokite can be found as inclusions in domeykite, algodonite, and magnetite. Kamiokite is associated with copper arsenides found in Michigan's Mohawk and Ahmeek copper mines. Although rare, kamiokite is predominantly found in mining environments and can indicate the presence of other minerals of interest, such as copper in the case of the Mohawk and Ahmeek mines. It is speculated that kamiokite can enhance the concentration of the copper it is hosted in.  

There are no known health risks associated with this mineral.

References

Iron(II) minerals
Molybdenum minerals
Oxide minerals
Hexagonal minerals
Minerals in space group 186